Pectinantus parini is a species of tubeshoulder known from the Pacific and Indian Oceans where it has been found at depths of around . This species grows to a length of  SL.

References
 

Platytroctidae
Fish of the Pacific Ocean
Fish of the Indian Ocean
Monotypic ray-finned fish genera
Fish described in 1986